Misspellings in German are a subcategory of orthographical errors (German: Rechtschreibfehler), counter the rules of German orthography. Although there is some variance following the current 'optional' status of the German spelling reform of 1996.

Misspelling in German is less common than in English since most words are spelled as they are pronounced. Exceptions however occur, as for the (in modern German) identical "ä" and "e" both representing the IPA [ε] sound. Confusion can also occur with homonyms as verb prefixes: wiederspiegeln (incorrect) vs. widerspiegeln (correct).

Misspellings of German words, outside Germany, also occur - for example by Bram Stoker and James Joyce.

See also
:de:Liste häufiger Rechtschreibfehler im Deutschen

References

German language
Spelling